The FIDE Online Chess Olympiad 2021 was the second FIDE Online Chess Olympiad, an annual online chess tournament organised by the Fédération Internationale des Échecs (FIDE) since 2020, following the onset of the COVID-19 pandemic. It was virtually hosted by China and took place from 20 August to 15 September 2021 on Chess.com's server. Russia finished first and the United States second,  while China and India tied for the third place.

Background 

In July 2021, the Fédération Internationale des Échecs (FIDE) announced that the second edition of the Online Chess Olympiad will be inaugurated on 13 August and last until 15 September. National federations intending to take part in the Olympiad confirmed their participation by 31 July and were to choose their top players and juniors to send for the event. The format of the tournament is the same as the first edition, the FIDE Online Chess Olympiad 2020, which was created after the 44th Chess Olympiad was postponed owing to the COVID-19 pandemic. The inaugural date was later revised to 20 August.

China, the virtual hosts of the event, sent two teams to the tournament, one from the mainland and the other from Shenzhen, both playing under the Chinese flag. The authorities of Shenzhen, including the Shenzhen Longgang District Culture and Sports Bureau, the Shenzhen MSU-BIT University, Shenzhen Chess Academy and the Shenzhen Pengcheng Chess Club, sponsored the tournament. The Russian e-commerce company Simaland was also a partner. The tournament is broadcast live on FIDE's YouTube channel and on Chess.com.

Participating teams 
153 teams are participating, and divided into 4 divisions. The top two teams in each division will advance to the quarter-finals while the other teams play against each other to qualify. The Afghanistan team withdrew from the event following the Taliban takeover of the country.

Results

Division 4

Pool A 

Nepal, Lebanon and Fiji advanced to Division 3.

Pool B 

Kenya, Palestine, Namibia and Malawi advanced to Division 3.

Pool C 

Angola, Cyprus and Ethiopia advanced to Division 3.

Pool D 

Suriname, Aruba, Ghana and Cape Verde advanced to Division 3.

Pool E

Division 3

Pool A 

Malaysia, Chinese Taipei and Sri Lanka advanced to Division 2.

Pool B 

Ireland, Lebanon and Iraq advanced to Division 2.

Pool C 

Scotland, Angola and Wales advanced to Division 2.

Pool D 

Bolivia, Uruguay and Paraguay advanced to Division 2.

Pool E 

Venezuela, El Salvador and Jamaica advanced to Division 2.

Division 2

Pool A 

Indonesia, Shenzhen (China) and Australia advanced to Top Division.

Pool B 

Latvia, Moldova and Italy advanced to Top Division.

Pool C 

Israel, Belarus and Sweden advanced to Top Division.

Pool D 

Slovenia, Argentina and Brazil advanced to Top Division.

Pool E 

Colombia, Cuba and Paraguay advanced to Top Division.

Top Division

Pool A 

Kazakhstan and China advanced to the playoffs.

Pool B 

India and Hungary advanced to the playoffs.

Pool C 

Russia and Ukraine advanced to the playoffs.

Pool D 

Poland and the United States advanced to the playoffs.

Playoffs

References

External links 
 

Chess Olympiads
2021 in chess